The 2008 KNSB Dutch Allround Championships in speed skating were held at the Kardinge ice stadium in Groningen, Netherlands on 27 and 28 December 2007. Although the event took place in December 2007 this was the 2008 edition as it is part of the 2007-08 speed skating season.

Sven Kramer defended his 2007 title by winning all four distances. In the women's tournament Ireen Wüst won the tournament with only winning the opening 500 m, young gun Marrit Leenstra won the 1500 m and veteran Renate Groenewold the 3000 m and 5000 m.

Schedule

Medalists

Allround

Distance

NOTE: TR = track record.

Men's results

Source male: Schaatsstatistieken.nl

Women's results

Source women: Schaatsstatistieken.nl

References

External links 
 Official site

KNSB Dutch Allround Championships
KNSB Dutch Allround Championships
2008 Allround
Sports competitions in Groningen (city)